This is a list of notable events in music that took place in the year 1925.

Specific locations
1925 in British music
1925 in Norwegian music

Specific genres
1925 in country music
1925 in jazz

Events
 January 1 – First day of radio broadcasting in Sweden: Gaston Borch conducts the Skandia Cinema Orchestra in the country's first broadcast of orchestral music.
 February 25 – Art Gillham (The Whispering Pianist) records the first electrical recordings to be released for Columbia using the Western Electric system (Master 140125-7 issued on Columbia 328-D).
 February 26 – Eight Popular Victor Artists record "A Miniature Concert," the first recorded (cf March 16 entry below) electrical recording by the Victor Talking Machine; the artists are Billy Murray, Frank Banta, Henry Burr, Albert Campbell, Frank Croxton, John Meyer, Monroe Silver, and Rudy Wiedoeft.
 March 1 – Edgard Varèse's Intégrales is premiered in New York City.
 March 16 – The Mask and Wig Club Double Male Quartet, with orchestra directed by Nathaniel Shilkret record "Joan of Arkansas," the first issued (cf February 26 entry above) electrical recording by the Victor Talking Machine, with catalog number 19626-A; the B-side, from the same Mask and Wig Club production, is recorded March 20 by the International Novelty Orchestra, also directed by Shilkret.
 March 21 – Maurice Ravel's L'Enfant et les sortilèges is premiered in Monte Carlo.
 April 3 – Gustav Holst's opera At the Boar's Head is premiered in Manchester.
 June 6 – Sergei Prokofiev's Symphony No. 2 is premiered in Paris.
 November 28 – The weekly country music radio program Grand Ole Opry is first broadcast on WSM radio in Nashville, Tennessee, as the "WSM Barn Dance".
 December 11 – Carl Nielsen's Symphony No. 6, the Sinfonia semplice, is premiered in Copenhagen.
 December 14 – Alban Berg's opera Wozzeck is given its first complete performance, in Berlin, conducted by Erich Kleiber.
Joseph Canteloube founds a group called La Bourrée in Paris to publicize the folklore and other attractions of the Auvergne.
 Victor, Columbia, and HMV phonograph companies switch from old acoustic mechanical recording methods to new electric microphone technology, one of the most important advances in recording history (see Shilkret for a first-hand account of its benefits).
 Blind Lemon Jefferson's recording career begins.
 Lonnie Johnson's recording career begins.
 Louis Armstrong leaves Fletcher Henderson's Orchestra, returns to Chicago, Illinois, and makes his first records under his own name, leading Louis Armstrong & His Hot Five.

Published popular music
 "Adios, Mariquita Linda" w. (Eng 1939) Ray Gilbert  (Sp) Marcos A. Jimenez m. Marcos A. Jimenez
 "Alone at Last" w. Gus Kahn m. Ted Fio Rito
 "Always" w.m. Irving Berlin
 "Bam, Bam, Bamy Shore" w. Mort Dixon m. Ray Henderson
 "Boneyard Shuffle" m. Hoagy Carmichael & Irving Mills
 "Brown Eyes, Why Are You Blue?" w. Alfred Bryan m. George W. Meyer
 "By the Light of the Stars" w.m. Arthur Sizemore, George A. Little, & Larry Shay
 "Bye and Bye" w. Lorenz Hart  m. Richard Rodgers
 "Cecilia" w. Herman Ruby m. Dave Dreyer
 "Cheatin' on Me" w. Jack Yellen m. Lew Pollack
 "Clap Hands! Here Comes Charley!" w. Billy Rose & Ballard MacDonald m. Joseph Meyer
 "Collegiate" w.m. Moe Jaffe & Nat Bonx
 "A Cup of Coffee, a Sandwich and You" w. Billy Rose & Al Dubin m. Joseph Meyer
 "Davenport Blues" m. Bix Beiderbecke
 "The Death of Floyd Collins" w. Andrew Jenkins m. Irene Spain
 "Dinah" w. Sam M. Lewis & Joe Young m. Harry Akst
 "Don't Bring Lulu" w. Billy Rose & Lew Brown m. Ray Henderson
 "Don't Wake Me Up, Let Me Dream" w. L.. Wolfe Gilbert m. Mabel Wayne
 "Down by the Winegar Works" w.m. Don Bestor, Roger Lewis & Walter Donovan
 "Drifting and Dreaming" w. Haven Gillespie, m. Egbert Van Alstyne, Erwin R. Schmidt & Loyal Curtis
 "D'Ye Love Me?" w. Otto Harbach & Oscar Hammerstein II m. Jerome Kern.  Introduced by Marilyn Miller in the musical Sunny
 "Five Foot Two Eyes of Blue" w. Sam M. Lewis & Joe Young m. Ray Henderson
 "Flamin' Mamie" w.m. Fred Rose & Paul Whiteman
 "Footloose" w. Hal Cochran m. Carl Rupp
 "Freshie" w. Harold Berg m. Jesse Greer
 "Grandpa's Spells" m. Jelly Roll Morton
 "Headin' for Louisville" w. B. G. De Sylva m. Joseph Meyer
 "Here in My Arms" w. Lorenz Hart m. Richard Rodgers
 "The Hills of Home" w. Floride Calhoun m. Oscar J. Fox
 "I Found a New Baby" w.m. Jack Palmer & Spencer Williams
 "I Lost My Heart in Heidelberg" w. Fritz Löhner-Beda & Ernst Neubach m. Fred Raymond
 "I Love My Baby" w. Bud Green m. Harry Warren
 "I Might Have Known" Lucas
 "I Miss My Swiss" w. L. Wolfe Gilbert m. Abel Baer
 "I Never Knew" w. Gus Kahn m. Ted Fio Rito
 "I Wonder Where My Baby Is Tonight" w. Gus Kahn m. Walter Donaldson
 "Ida, I Do" w. Gus Kahn m. Isham Jones
 "If I Had a Girl Like You" w. Billy Rose & Mort Dixon m. Ray Henderson
 "If You Knew Susie" w. B. G. De Sylva m. Joseph Meyer
 "I'm A Little Bit Fonder of You" w.m. Irving Caesar
 "I'm Gonna Charleston Back to Charleston" w.m. Roy Turk & Lou Handman
 "I'm Gonna Cry" Martha Boswell
 "I'm in Love Again" w.m. Cole Porter
 "I'm Knee-Deep in Daisies (And Head Over Heels In Love)" Ash, Shay, Goodwin, Little, Stanley
 "I'm Sitting on Top of the World" w. Sam M. Lewis & Joe Young m. Ray Henderson
 "In Your Green Hat" w. Jack Yellen m. Milton Ager
 "I've Confessed to the Breeze" w. Otto Harbach m. Vincent Youmans
 "Jalousie" (a.k.a. "Jealousy") w. Vera Bloom m. Jacob Gade
 "Just a Cottage Small" w. B. G. De Sylva m. James F. Hanley
 "Keep Your Skirts Down, Mary Ann" w. Andrew B. Sterling m. Robert A. King & Ray Henderson
 "Leander" w. Harry Graham m. Jean Gilbert from the musical theater production 'Katja The Dancer'
 "Let It Rain! Let It Pour!" w. Cliff Friend m. Walter Donaldson
 "Looking For a Boy" w. Ira Gershwin m. George Gershwin. Introduced by Queenie Smith in the musical Tip-Toes
 "Love Me Tonight" w. Brian Hooker m. Rudolf Friml
 "Manhattan" w. Lorenz Hart  m. Richard Rodgers
 "Masculine Women! Feminine Men!" w. Edgar Leslie m. James V. Monaco
 "Moonlight and Roses" w. Ben Black m. Neil Moret (adapted without permission from a composition by Edwin Lemare)
 "My Bundle of Love" w.m. Georgie Price & Abner Silver
 "My Sweetie Turned Me Down" w. Gus Kahn m. Walter Donaldson
 "My Yiddishe Momme" w. Jack Yellen m. Lew Pollack
 "Neapolitan Nights (Nights Of Splendour)" w. Harry D. Kerr m. J. S. Zumecnik
 "No, No, Nanette" w. Otto Harbach m. Vincent Youmans
 "Oh, How I Miss You Tonight" w.m. Benny Davis, Joe Burke & Mark Fisher
 "Only a Rose" w. Brian Hooker m. Rudolf Friml
 "Paddlin' Madelin Home" w.m. Harry M. Woods
 "Pal of My Cradle Days" w. Marshall Montgomery m. Al Piantadosi
 "The Pearls" m. Jelly Roll Morton
 "Poor Little Rich Girl" w.m. Noël Coward
 "Remember" w.m. Irving Berlin
 "Roll 'Em Girls" w.m. Archie Fletcher & Bobby Heath
 "Rose of Samarkand" m. Eric Coates
 "Save Your Sorrow (for Tomorrow)" w. B. G. De Sylva m.  Al Sherman
 "See See Rider Blues" by Ma Rainey
 "Sentimental Me" w. Lorenz Hart m. Richard Rodgers
 "Shake That Thing" Charlie Jackson
 "She Showed Him This, She Showed Him That" Stone & David
 "Show Me the Way to Go Home" w.m. Irving King
 "Sleepy Time Gal" w. Joseph R. Alden & Raymond B. Egan m. Ange Lorenzo & Richard A. Whiting
 "Some Day" w. Brian Hooker m. Rudolf Friml
 "Sometime" w. Gus Kahn m. Ted Fio Rito
 "Song of the Flame" w. Otto Harbach & Oscar Hammerstein II m. George Gershwin & Herbert Stothart
 "Song of the Vagabonds" w. Brian Hooker m. Rudolf Friml
 "Stack O'Lee Blues" trad w.m. Lopez, Colwell
 "Sugar Foot Stomp" (adapted from "Dipper Mouth Blues" (1923)) w. Walter Melrose m. Joe "King" Oliver
 "Sunny" w. Otto Harbach & Oscar Hammerstein II m. Jerome Kern
 "Sweet and Low-Down" w. Ira Gershwin m. George Gershwin
 "Sweet Georgia Brown" w.m. Ben Bernie, Maceo Pinkard & Kenneth Casey
 "Tea for Two" w. Irving Caesar m. Vincent Youmans
 "Thanks for the Buggy Ride" w.m. Jules Buffano
 "That Certain Feeling" w. Ira Gershwin m. George Gershwin
 "That Certain Party" w. Gus Kahn m. Walter Donaldson
 "That Saxophone Waltz" w. Jules Mingo & Berry J. Sisk m. Berry J. Sisk
 "Then I'll Be Happy" w. Sidney Clare & Lew Brown m. Cliff Friend
 "Too Many Rings Around Rosie" w. Irving Caesar m. Vincent Youmans
 "Two Little Bluebirds" w. Otto Harbach & Oscar Hammerstein II m. Jerome Kern
 "Ukulele Lady" w. Gus Kahn m. Richard Whiting
 "Valentine" w. Albert Willemetz (Fr) Herbert Reynolds (Eng) m. Henri Christin
 "Waters of the Perkiomen" w. Al Dubin m. F. Henri Klickmann
 "When the Sergeant Major's on Parade" w.m. Ernest Longstaffe
 "Who Takes Care of the Caretaker's Daughter?" w.m. Chick Endor
 "Who?" w. Otto Harbach & Oscar Hammerstein II m. Jerome Kern
 "Why Do I Love You?" w. B. G. De Sylva & Ira Gershwin m. George Gershwin
 "The Wreck of the Shenandoah" w.m. Vernon Dalhart, Carson Robison, and Elmer S. Hughes.
 "Yearning" w. Benny Davis m. Joe Burke
 "Yes Sir, That's My Baby" w. Gus Kahn m. Walter Donaldson

Top Popular Recordings 1925

The following songs achieved the highest positions in Joel Whitburn's Pop Memories 1890-1954 and record sales reported on the "Discography of American Historical Recordings" website during 1924:
Numerical rankings are approximate, they are only used as a frame of reference.

Classical music
Isidor Achron – Violin Concerto No. 1
Pedro Humberto Allende –
Mientras baja la nieve, for voice and piano
El surtidor, for voice and piano
A las nubes, for voice and piano
Ojitas de pena, for voice and piano
Tres Tonadas, for orchestra
Tempo di minuetto in C major, for piano
Tempo de vals, for harp
Béla Bartók – Dance Suite (version for piano of an orchestral work written in 1923)
Ernest Bloch – Concerto Grosso No. 1, for piano and strings
Frank Bridge –
"Golden Hair", for voice and piano
"Journey's End", for tenor or high baritone and piano
The Pneu World, for cello and piano
Songs of Rabindranath Tagore (3), for voice and piano, or voice and orchestra
Vignettes de Marseille, for piano
Winter Pastorale, for piano
Carlos Chávez –
Cake Walk, for piano
Los cuatro soles, ballet, for soprano and chamber orchestra
Energía, for nine instruments
Foxtrot, for piano
36, for piano
Aaron Copland – Music for the Theatre, for chamber orchestra
Henry Cowell –
The Banshee, for string piano
Ensemble, for two violins, two cellos, and thundersticks
Slow Jig, for piano
Frederick Delius – A Late Lark, for voice and orchestra
Edward Elgar –
"The Herald", part-song, SATB
"The Prince of Sleep", part-song, SATB
Eduardo Fabini –
A mi río, for mixed choir and orchestra
Luz mala, for soprano and orchestra 
Triste No. 1, version for orchestra
John Fernström – Violin Concerto No. 1
Jacob Gade – Jalousie, for cello and piano
George Gershwin – Piano Concerto in F
Leopold Godowsky – Java Suite
William Henry Harris – Faire Is the Heaven
Gustav Holst –
"God Is Love, His the Care", for choir
Hymns (4) for Songs of Praise, for choir
Motets (2), for choir
Ode to C.K.S. and the Oriana, for choir
Terzetto, for flute, oboe, and viola
Herbert Howells – Piano Concerto No. 2
Jacques Ibert – Concerto for cello and wind instruments
John Ireland – Two Pieces for Piano 1925
Ernst Krenek –
Die Jahreszeiten, Op. 35, for choir
Mammon, Op. 37, ballet, for orchestra
Der vertauschte Cupido, Op. 38, ballet, for orchestra 
Bohuslav Martinů – String Quartet No. 2
Carl Nielsen – Symphony No. 6 Sinfonia Semplice
Juan Carlos Paz –
Chorale in F-sharp major, for piano
Cuatro fugas sobre un tema, for piano
Piano Sonata No. 2, in B-flat minor
Sergei Prokofiev – Symphony No. 2, Iron and Steel
Ottorino Respighi –
Concerto in modo misolidio, for piano and orchestra
Poema autunnale, for violinand orchestra
Rossiniana, suite for orchestra
Albert Roussel –
Duo, for bassoon and contrabass
Segovia, Op. 29, for guitar
Serenade, Op. 30, for flute, string trio, and harp
Arnold Schoenberg –
Drei Satiren, Op. 28, for SATB choir with viola, cello, and piano
Vier Stücke, Op. 27, for SATB choir with clarinet, mandolin, violin, and cello
Erwin Schulhoff – Symphony No. 1, String Quartet No. 2
Ruth Crawford Seeger –
The Adventures of Tom Thumb, for piano
Piano Preludes Nos. 1–5
Dmitri Shostakovich – Symphony No. 1
Jean Sibelius –
Ett ensamt skidspår, for reciting voice and piano
Herran siunaus, for choir and organ
Intrada, for organ, Op. 111, No. 1
Kolme johdantovuorolaulua, for choir and organ
Morceau romantique sur un motif de M. Jacob de Julin, for orchestra
Narciss, for voice and piano
Skolsång, for choir
Skyddskårsmarsch, for choir
Stormen [The Tempest], Op. 109, incidental music for Shakespeare's play
Igor Stravinsky –
Serenade in A, for piano
Suite No. 1, for small orchestra
Suite, "d’après thèmes, fragments et pièces de Giambattista Pergolesi", for violin and piano
Marcel Tournier – Images No. 1, Op. 29; Etude de Concert "Au Matin"
Joaquín Turina –
La oración del torero, Op. 34, for lute quartet, also arranged for string quartet or string orchestra
La venta de los gatos, Op. 32, for piano
Edgard Varèse – Intégrales
Ralph Vaughan Williams – 
Concerto Accademico for violin and strings 
Flos Campi, for viola, wordless choir, and small orchestra
Hymns (5) for Songs of Praise, for choir
Two Poems by Seumas O'Sullivan, for voice and piano
Three Songs from Shakespeare, for voice and piano
Three Poems by Walt Whitman, for baritone and piano 
Heitor Villa-Lobos –
Chôros No. 3 ("Pica-páo"), for male choir or seven wind instruments, or both together
Chôros No. 5 ("Alma brasileira"), for piano
Chôros No. 8, for large orchestra and two pianos
Cirandinhas, for piano
O Martírio dos Insetos, for violin and orchestra
Sul America, for piano
William Walton – Portsmouth Point, concert overture
Kurt Weill – Violin Concerto
Alberto Williams –
Canciones pasionales, for voice and piano
Piezas modernas para los niños, for piano
Stefan Wolpe – Three Songs by Heinrich von Kleist

Opera
Alban Berg – Wozzeck
Armstrong Gibbs – Blue Peter
Reynaldo Hahn – Mozart
Maurice Ravel – L'enfant et les sortilèges

Film
Edmund Meisel – Battleship Potemkin

Jazz

Musical theater
 Big Boy Broadway production opened at the Winter Garden Theatre on January 7 and later moved to the 44th Street Theatre for a total run of 168 performances
 Boodle London production opened at the Empire Theatre on March 10 and ran for 94 performances
 By the Way Broadway revue opened at the Gaiety Theatre on December 28 and ran for 176 performances.  Starring Cicely Courtneidge.
 The Cocoanuts Broadway production opened at the Lyric Theatre on December 8 and ran for 375 performances
 Dearest Enemy (Music: Richard Rodgers, Lyrics: Lorenz Hart, Book: Herbert Fields.  Broadway production opened at the Knickerbocker Theatre on September 18 and ran for 286 performances.  Starring Helen Hart and Charles Purcell.
 The Dollar Princess London revival
 Garrick Gaieties Broadway revue opened at the Garrick Theatre on June 8 and ran for 211 performances
 Katja the Dancer London production opened on February 21 at the Gaiety Theatre and ran for 505 performances
 Mercenary Mary Broadway production opened at the Longacre Theatre on April 13 and ran for 136 performances
 No, No, Nanette (Irving Caesar, Otto Harbach, and Vincent Youmans)
 London production opened at the Palace Theatre on March 11 and ran for 665 performances
Broadway production opened at the Globe Theatre on September 16 and ran for 321 performances
 On With the Dance London revue opened at the Pavilion on April 30 and ran for 229 performances
 Rose-Marie London production opened at the Theatre Royal, Drury Lane on March 20 and ran for 851 performances
 Sunny Broadway production opened at the New Amsterdam Theatre on September 22 and ran for 517 performances
 Tip-Toes Broadway production opened at the Liberty Theatre on December 28 and ran for 194 performances
 The Vagabond King Broadway production opened at the Casino Theatre on September 21 and ran for 511 performances

Births
January 13 – Gwen Verdon, singer and actress (d. 2000)
February 7 – Marius Constant, composer and conductor (d. 2004)
February 16 – Carlos Paredes, guitarist (d. 2004)
February 17 – Ron Goodwin, film composer (d. 2003)
February 19 – Jindřich Feld, composer and teacher (d. 2007)
February 26 – Delkash, singer (d. 2004)
March 4 – Paul Mauriat, French musician (Love Is Blue) (d. 2006)
March 8 – Dennis Lotis, South African-born British singer (d. 2023)
March 22 – Gerard Hoffnung, cartoonist, comedian, musician (d. 1959)
March 26 – Pierre Boulez, French composer, conductor and author (d. 2016)
April 2 – Wilf Doyle, accordionist (d. 2012)
April 14 – Gene Ammons, jazz saxophonist (d. 1974)
April 26 – Jørgen Ingmann, guitarist (d. 2015)
April 30 – Johnny Horton, American country music and rockabilly singer (d. 1960)
May 14 – Boris Parsadanian, Armenian-Estonian composer (d. 1997)
May 15 – Andrei Eshpai, composer (d. 2015)
May 22 – James King, tenor (d. 2005)
May 23 – Mac Wiseman, American bluegrass singer-songwriter and guitarist (d. 2019)
May 25 – Aldo Clementi, composer (d. 2011)
May 28 – Dietrich Fischer-Dieskau, Lieder singer (d. 2012)
June 1 – Marie Knight, American singer (d. 2009)
June 25 – Clifton Chenier, zydeco accordionist (d. 1987)
June 27
Fiora Contino, American opera conductor (d. 2017)
Doc Pomus, American songwriter (d. 1991)
July 4 – Cathy Berberian, American mezzo-soprano and composer (d. 1983)
July 6 – Bill Haley, American singer (d. 1981)
July 11
Charles Chaynes, French classical composer (d. 2016)
Mattiwilda Dobbs, African American coloratura soprano (d. 2015)
Nicolai Gedda, Swedish operatic tenor (d. 2017)
July 28
Kenneth Alwyn, conductor (d. 2020)
André Boucourechliev, composer (d. 1997)
July 29 – Mikis Theodorakis, composer (d. 2021)
July 30 – Antoine Duhamel, French composer (d. 2014)
August 3 – Dom Um Romão, Brazilian jazz drummer (d. 2005)
August 7
 Felice Bryant, American songwriter (d. 2003)
 Julián Orbón, Spanish Cuban composer (d. 1991)
August 15
Aldo Ciccolini, pianist (d. 2015)
Robert Massard, French baritone
Oscar Peterson, pianist (d. 2007)
August 27 – Gordon Tobing, Indonesian folk singer (d. 1993 in music)
August 28 – Donald O'Connor, dancer, singer and actor (d. 2003)
September 1 – Art Pepper, jazz musician (d. 1982)
September 2 – Russ Conway, pianist (d. 2000)
September 3 – Hank Thompson, country musician (d. 2007)
September 6 – Jimmy Reed, blues singer (d. 1976)
September 8 – Peter Sellers, English comic actor and novelty singer (d. 1980)
September 10 – Boris Tchaikovsky, composer (d. 1996)
September 11
Alan Bergman, US songwriter
Cliff Hall, folk singer (The Spinners) (d. 2008)
Harry Somers, composer (d. 1999)
September 13 – Mel Tormé, singer (d. 1999)
September 16 – B. B. King, blues musician (d. 2015)
September 26 – Marty Robbins, country singer (d. 1982)
September 28 – Cromwell Everson, South African composer (d. 1991)
October 3 – George Wein, American jazz promoter and pianist (d. 2021)
October 5 – Herbert Kretzmer, songwriter (d. 2020)
October 15 – Mickey Baker, guitarist, half of the duo Mickey & Sylvia (d. 2012)
October 16 – Angela Lansbury, English actress and singer (d. 2022)
October 20 – Tom Dowd, recording engineer/record producer (d. 2002)
October 21 – Virginia Zeani, soprano
October 24 – Luciano Berio, composer (d. 2003)
October 29 – Zoot Sims, jazz saxophonist (d. 1985)
November 17 – Sir Charles Mackerras, conductor (d. 2010)
November 22 – Gunther Schuller, composer, horn player and conductor (d. 2015)
December 8 – Sammy Davis, Jr., entertainer (d. 1990)
December 13 – Dick Van Dyke, American actor, singer, dancer and comedian
December 19 – Robert B. Sherman, songwriter, brother of Richard M. Sherman, son of songwriter Al Sherman (d. 2012)
December 31 – Daphne Oram, composer (d. 2003)
date unknown – Julito Collazo, percussionist (d. 2004)

Deaths
January 6 – Ferdinand Löwe, Austrian conductor (b. 1865)
January 8 – Jimmy Palao, African-American jazz multi-instrumentalist, leader of the Original Creole Band (born 1879)
February 11 – Aristide Bruant, French singer and nightclub owner (b. 1851)
February 14 – Giuseppe Donati, inventor of the ocarina (b. 1836)
February 17 – Alwina Valleria, operatic soprano (b. 1848)
February 20 – Marco Enrico Bossi, organist and composer (b. 1861)
February 21 – Fernando de Lucia, operatic tenor (b. 1860)
February 24 – John Palm, Curaçao-born composer (b. 1885)
March 4 – Moritz Moszkowski, Polish composer (b. 1854)
March 22 – Marie Brema, operatic mezzo-soprano (b. 1856)
April 3 – Jean de Reszke, operatic tenor (b. 1850)
April 22 – André Caplet, conductor and composer (b. 1878)
April 25 – George Stephănescu, Romanian composer (b. 1843)
May 12 – Arthur Napoleão dos Santos, Brazilian composer and pianist (b. 1843)
May 25 – Henry W. Petrie, US songwriter (b. 1857)
June 16 – Emmett Hardy, jazz musician (b. 1903)
July 1 – Erik Satie, composer (b. 1866)
July 9 – Leverett DeVeber, politician and singer (b. 1849)
August 4 – Charles W. Clark, American baritone (b. 1865)
August 11 – Theodore Spiering, violinist and conductor (b. 1871)
August 16 – Edna Hicks, blues singer (b. 1895) (killed in fire)
September 16 – Leo Fall, composer (b. 1873)
December 9 – Eugène Gigout, composer and organist (b. 1844)
December 13 – Caroline von Gomperz-Bettelheim, pianist and opera singer (b. 1845)
December 19 – José Ignacio Quintón, Puerto Rican composer and pianist (b. 1881)
December 27 – Guido Menasci, opera librettist (b. 1867)
date unknown – Hans Winderstein, conductor and composer (b. 1859)

References

 
20th century in music
Music by year